Guzmania compacta is a plant species in the genus Guzmania. This species is native to Costa Rica, Panama and Nicaragua.

References

compacta
Flora of Central America
Plants described in 1896